Spim or SPIM may refer to :

 SPIM, another name for instant messaging spam
 SPIM, Selective Plane Illumination Microscopy
 SPIM, a simulated assembly language written for MIPS architecture.
 Single phase induction motor (SPIM), a type of AC induction motor
 Jorge Chávez International Airport in Lima, Peru (Former ICAO airport code SPIM)
 Somali People's Insurgent Movement (SPIM), also known as the Popular Resistance Movement in the Land of the Two Migrations (PRM)
 Southern Plains Indian Museum (SPIM), Anadarko, Oklahoma